The canton of Compiègne-1 is an administrative division of the Oise department, northern France. It was created at the French canton reorganisation which came into effect in March 2015. Its seat is in Compiègne.

It consists of the following communes:
 
Attichy
Autrêches
Berneuil-sur-Aisne
Bienville
Bitry
Choisy-au-Bac
Clairoix
Compiègne (partly)
Couloisy
Courtieux
Janville
Jaulzy
Margny-lès-Compiègne
Moulin-sous-Touvent
Nampcel
Rethondes
Saint-Crépin-aux-Bois
Saint-Pierre-lès-Bitry
Tracy-le-Mont
Trosly-Breuil

References

Cantons of Oise